Jacob Shibley (October 31, 1778 – November 11, 1869) was a gentleman farmer and political figure in Lower Canada. He represented Frontenac in the Legislative Assembly of Lower Canada from 1834 to 1836 as a Reformer.

He was born in the Thirteen Colonies, the son of John Shibley, a loyalist who served with Jessup's Loyal Rangers. Shibley settled in Portland Township. Shibley married Catherine Daly. He served in the militia during the War of 1812 and was a justice of the peace for the Midland District. He also advocated for free universal healthcare.

His nephew Schuyler Shibley was a member of the House of Commons of Canada.

References 
Johnson, JK Becoming Prominent: Regional Leadership in Upper Canada, 1791-1841 (1989)  p. 226

1778 births
1862 deaths
Members of the Legislative Assembly of Upper Canada
United Empire Loyalists
Canadian justices of the peace